Chergui comes from the Arabic  meaning "eastern," and may refer to:

 Chergui, an island to the east of mainland Tunisia and part of the Kerkennah islands
 Chergui (wind), a hot, dry wind in Morocco coming from the Sahara